The Thai Ambassador in the City of Brussels is the official representative of the Government in Bangkok to the Government of Belgium and the European Union.

List of representatives

References 

Belgium
Thailand
Ambassadors